ICPC is an initialism which may refer to:

 International Collegiate Programming Contest
 Independent Corrupt Practices Commission, Nigeria
 International Cable Protection Committee, United Kingdom
 International Centre for the Prevention of Crime, Montreal, Canada
 International Classification of Primary Care, a medical classification method
 International Criminal Police Commission, former name of Interpol
 Interstate Compact on the Placement of Children, a contract among all 50 U.S. states, the District of Columbia and the Virgin Islands
 International Cyber Policy Centre, Australia